Gheorghe Malarciuc (6 June 1934 in Bursuc – 30 October 1992 in Chişinău) was a screenwriter and politician from Moldova. He served as the first head of the Ecologist Party of Moldova "Green Alliance". He graduated in 1956 from Moldovan State University and worked for Moldova-Film and Literaturnaya Gazeta.

Film
Fiction: 
The last night in heaven (with the participation of I.Prut), 1964;
Serghei Lazo, 1967;
Wedding in palace (co-author C.Condrea), 1979;
red snowstorm, 1971;
Sergei Lazo's life and immortality, f/t, 3 episodes, 1985;
Black magic, 1991
Documentaries: 
Our Cojusna, 1958;
Romanesti, 1976;
The time of coming true, 1977;
The legend of vines, 1981;
My home, Moldova!, 1983;
Masters and servants, 1988;
Ion Druta, 1989

Works
 Firicel de iarbă verde (1959),
 La Piatra Cucului, Victoria Haiei Lifşiţ (1963),
 Badea Cozma (1974).
 Zile de foc, de apă şi de pământ (1974),
 Marseillaise (1984),
 Dragă consăteanule! (1984).
 Ultima noapte în rai (1964),
 Serghei Lazo (1967),
 Viscolul roşu (1971).
 Din moşi strămoşi (1959),
 Copilul şi luna (1959),
 Legende despre Lazo (1971).
 Patru paşi pe harta Americii (1972),
 Scrisori din casa părintească (1980).

Bibliography
 Chişinău, Enciclopedie, 1997, Ed. "Museum"
 Profiluri literare. - Chişinău, 1972.
 Literatura şi arta Moldovei: Encicl. - Vol.1. - Chişinău, 1985.
 Mihai Cimpoi, O istorie deschisă a literaturii române din Basarabia. - Chişinău, 1996.

References

External links 
 Malarciuc Gheorghe - scriitor, scenarist
 Environmental Party of Moldova "Green Alliance"
 MALARCIUC GHEORGHE

1934 births
1992 deaths
Moldova State University alumni
Moldovan writers
Moldovan male writers
Moldovan activists
Moldovan politicians
Moldovan screenwriters
20th-century screenwriters